The Case STX Steiger is a tractor line built by Case IH. This line continues the models built by Steiger Tractor, which was purchased by Case IH in 1986.

The tractors are built in Case IH's plant in Fargo, North Dakota, where already 50,000 units of this line were built as of September 2005.

This tractor line is powered by engines with 405 to 682 hp. They are available in wheeled, Quadtrac, and row-crop Rowtrac configurations, and are very closely related to the New Holland T9 range.

In 2005, the STX500 Quadtrac tractor set a new Ploughing World Record.  The machine ploughed 321ha in just 24 hours, led by Jean Imbert who drove the tractor.

In 2007, the STX530 Quadtrac tractor was featured on the television series Top Gear, where presenter Richard Hammond chose the STX Steiger for some of the challenges, (eventually including ploughing.) It was lapped around the Top Gear Test Track by The Stig, finishing in a time of 4:49.1, which is the slowest lap ever round the track.  In 2005 that model of tractor broke the 24-hour ploughing World Record, turning  of farmland in just 24 hours.

Performance 

 Displacement: 8.7-12.9 L
 Peak horsepower: 405–682 hp
 Torque rise: 35–40%
 Fuel tank: 200 gal. (758 L)–300 gal. (1,138 L)
 Operating Weight (wheeled): 39,600 lb. (17,960 kg)–54,000 lb. (24,494 kg)
 Operating Weight (Quadtrac): 58,000 lb. (26,308 kg)
 Wheelbase: 139 in. (353 cm)–154 in. (391 cm)
 16 speed power shift transmission
 2 reverse gears
 Top Speed: 30 km/h (18.7 mph)@2,100rpm
 Top Reverse Speed: 14.7 km/h (9.1 mph)@2,100rpm
 Produced: Fargo, North Dakota

Models 
(currently produced as of June 2019)
 Steiger 350 
 Steiger/Rowtrac 370
 Steiger/Rowtrac 420
 Steiger/Rowtrac/Quadtrac 470
 Steiger/Rowtrac/Quadtrac 500
 Steiger/Quadtrac 540
 Steiger/Quadtrac 580
 Steiger/Quadtrac 620

References

External links

Official site

Tractors